Luka Belić (born 18 April 1996) is a Serbian football forward who plays for Poros.

Club career
He made his Jelen SuperLiga debut for OFK Beograd at home against Red Star Belgrade on 25 April 2012 and became the youngest player in history of the Serbian top division.

On 13 September 2015, Belić signed for West Ham United. On 31 August 2016, Belić signed on loan for Scottish Premiership club Motherwell, agreeing a six-month deal.

On 6 February 2017, Belić joined Slovenian club NK Celje.

Ahead of the 2017–18 Serbian SuperLiga season, Belić returned to Serbia, signing for Spartak Subotica. Belić only made one appearance during his time at the club, scoring in a 8–1 Serbian Cup win against Polet Lipljan.

Following his spell with Spartak Subotica, Belić joined Greek club Nestos Chrysoupoli in 2018.

In 2019, Belić signed for his hometown club Dinamo Pančevo.

In January 2020, Belić returned to Greece, joining AO Ypato, before signing for Poros in July 2021.

International career
Belić has been capped for Serbia's under-17 and under-19 national teams.

Personal life
Belić's father, Dušan, is a former professional football. Belić's brother, Kristijan, is also a professional footballer.

Belić holds a Belgian passport.

References

External links
 
 Luka Belić Stats at utakmica.rs 
 Luka Belić at UEFA.com
 OFK Beograd profile 

1996 births
Living people
Sportspeople from Pančevo
Association football forwards
Association football wingers
Serbian footballers
OFK Beograd players
Serbian SuperLiga players
Slovenian PrvaLiga players
West Ham United F.C. players
Motherwell F.C. players
NK Celje players
FK Spartak Subotica players
FK Dinamo Pančevo players
Serbian expatriate footballers
Expatriate footballers in England
Serbian expatriate sportspeople in England
Expatriate footballers in Scotland
Serbian expatriate sportspeople in Slovenia
Expatriate footballers in Slovenia
Serbian expatriate sportspeople in Greece
Expatriate footballers in Greece
Serbian expatriate sportspeople in Scotland